Amblyseius tsugawai is a species of predatory mite belonging to the family Phytoseiidae. This oval mite, less than 0.5 mm in length, is only known from apple trees on Honshū, Japan. It is very similar to congeners found outside Japan but can be distinguished by details of the setation on the fourth pair of legs.

References
Some predatory mites of the genera Typhlodromus and Amblyseius from Japan (Phytoseiidae). Shôzô Ehara, Acarologia I.

tsugawai
Animals described in 1959
Chelicerates of Japan